Excell is a surname. Notable people with the surname include:
 E. O. Excell (1851–1921), American publisher and composer
 Peter Excell (1948–2020), British engineer, scientist, and researcher
 Sidney Excell (1906–1990), British Army officer during World War II

See also
 Excel (disambiguation)